Argenteuil—La Petite-Nation is a federal electoral district in Quebec. It encompasses a portion of Quebec formerly included in the electoral districts of Argenteuil—Papineau—Mirabel (69%) and Pontiac (31%).

Argenteuil—La Petite-Nation was created by the 2012 federal electoral boundaries redistribution and was legally defined in the 2013 representation order. It came into effect upon the call of the 42nd Canadian federal election, scheduled for 19 October 2015.

History

Election results

References

Quebec federal electoral districts
Lachute
Politics of Gatineau